Golden Days Radio (official call sign 3GDR) is a Melbourne-based community radio station broadcasting on 95.7 FM from a transmitter located at Caulfield Racecourse.

Programming
Golden Days Radio is broadcast mostly thanks to volunteer presenters and a small number of staff, some of whom are former radio professionals.

Notable presenters
 Bob Horsfall
 Alex Hehr
 Ramesh Rajan

See also
List of radio stations in Australia

References

Radio stations in Melbourne
Community radio stations in Australia
Oldies radio stations in Australia
Radio stations established in 2001